Init sa Magdamag may refer to:

 Init sa Magdamag (film), a 1983 Philippine film
 Init sa Magdamag (TV series), a 2021 Philippine TV series
 Init sa Magdamag, a song by Sharon Cuneta and Nonoy Zuñiga